1266 Tone  is a dark background asteroid from the outer regions of the asteroid belt, approximately 80 kilometers in diameter. Discovered by astronomer Okuro Oikawa at the Tokyo Observatory in 1927, it was assigned the provisional designation . The asteroid was later named after the Tone River, one of Japan's largest rivers.

Discovery 

It was discovered by Japanese astronomer Okuro Oikawa at the Tokyo Observatory on 23 January 1927. On the following night, it was independently discovered by Soviet astronomer Grigory Neujmin at the Simeiz Observatory on the Crimean peninsula. The Minor Planet Center only recognizes the first discoverer.

Orbit and classification 

Tone is a non-family asteroid from the main belt's background population. It orbits the Sun in the outer asteroid belt at a distance of 3.2–3.5 AU once every 6 years and 2 months (2,250 days; semi-major axis of 3.36 AU). Its orbit has an eccentricity of 0.05 and an inclination of 17° with respect to the ecliptic.

Physical characteristics 

In the Tholen classification, Tone is a primitive and dark P-type asteroid.

Rotation period 

In October 1999, two rotational lightcurves of Tone were obtained from photometric observations by American astronomer Brian Warner at his Palmer Divide Observatory in Colorado. Lightcurve analysis gave two divergent rotation periods of 7.40 and 11.82 hours with a brightness variation of 0.06 and 0.12 magnitude, respectively. Observation by Italian astronomers Roberto Crippa and Federico Manzini in October 2005, gave another tentative period of 12.9 hours and an amplitude of 0.07 magnitude. The LCDB currently adopts a period of 7.40 hours.

Diameter and albedo 

According to the surveys carried out by the Infrared Astronomical Satellite IRAS, the Japanese Akari satellite and the NEOWISE mission of NASA's Wide-field Infrared Survey Explorer, Tone measures between 70.70 and 94.10 kilometers in diameter and its surface has an albedo between 0.039 and 0.0566.

The Collaborative Asteroid Lightcurve Link adopts the results obtained by IRAS, that is, an albedo of 0.0566 and a diameter of 73.34 kilometers based on an absolute magnitude of 9.41.

Naming 

This minor planet was named after Tone River (Tone-gawa), Japan's second-largest river after the Shinano River. The official naming citation was mentioned in The Names of the Minor Planets by Paul Herget in 1955.

Notes

References

External links 
 Asteroid Lightcurve Database (LCDB), query form (info )
 Dictionary of Minor Planet Names, Google books
 Asteroids and comets rotation curves, CdR – Observatoire de Genève, Raoul Behrend
 Discovery Circumstances: Numbered Minor Planets (1)-(5000) – Minor Planet Center
 
 

001266
Discoveries by Okuro Oikawa
Named minor planets
001266
19270123